Ross-shire is a historic county in the Scottish Highlands. The county borders Sutherland to the north and Inverness-shire to the south, as well as having a complex border with Cromartyshire – a county consisting of numerous enclaves or exclaves scattered throughout Ross-shire's territory. Ross-shire includes most of Ross along with Lewis in the Outer Hebrides. Dingwall is the traditional county town. The area of Ross-shire is based on that of the historic province of Ross, but with the exclusion of the many enclaves that form Cromartyshire.

For shreival purposes the area was first separated from the authority of the sheriff of Inverness by Act of Parliament during the reign of King James IV, the sheriff to sit at Tain or Dingwall. Sheriffs were seldom appointed, and further acts of 1649 and 1661 restated its separation from Inverness. The 1661 act also clarified the area encompassed, based on the pre-Reformation Diocese of Ross. Sir George Mackenzie's Ross-shire estates were transferred to Cromartyshire by a 1685 Act of Parliament (repealed 1686, re-enacted 1690).

The Local Government (Scotland) Act 1889 provided that "the counties of Ross and Cromarty shall cease to be separate counties, and shall be united for all purposes whatsoever, under the name of the county of Ross and Cromarty." The two counties that became the single local government county of Ross and Cromarty, which continued to be used for local government purposes until 1975, although Ross-shire remained as the postal county for the mainland part of the local government county until 1996.

In 1975, Ross and Cromarty was itself replaced by the Highland region and the Western Isles, under the Local Government (Scotland) Act 1973. The region became a unitary council area in 1996, under the Local Government etc. (Scotland) Act 1994.

There was a Ross-shire constituency of the Parliament of Great Britain from 1708 to 1801, and of the Parliament of the United Kingdom from 1801 to 1832. In 1832 it was merged with the Cromartyshire constituency to form the Ross and Cromarty constituency.

Geography

Western Ross-shire, also known as Wester Ross, is typified by its mountainous Highland scenery, especially the Torridon Hills which includes such peaks as Beinn Eighe and Liathach. It contains a long, fractured coastline along The Minch and Inner Sound (opposite Skye), consisting of a number of isolated peninsulas split by sea lochs; from north to south the chief of these are Loch Broom, the Scoraig peninsula, Little Loch Broom, Gruinard Bay, Rubha Mòr peninsula, Loch Ewe, Rua Reidh/Melvaig peninsula, Loch Gairloch, Loch Torridon, Applecross peninsula, Loch Kishorn, Loch Carron, Lochalsh peninsula, Loch Long, Loch Duich and the Glenelg peninsula which is shared with Inverness-shire.

The eastern half (Easter Ross) is generally flatter, and consists of  towns, villages and farmland bordering the Moray Firth. In the north Dornoch Firth separates the county from Sutherland; near the Dornoch Firth Bridge lies the thin, tapering Ness of Portnaculter peninsula. In the north-east can be found the hammerhead-shaped Tarbat peninsula which is shared with Cromartyshire; across Cromarty Firth lies the Black Isle (actually a peninsula not an island), which is also shared with Cromartyshire. To the south-east Beauly Firth forms the border with Inverness-shire.

The county contains numerous lochs, the most prominent of these being Loch Ailsh, Crom Loch, Loch a' Choire Mhòir, Loch Fada, Lochan Gaineamhaich, Loch Cluanie, Loch Loyne, Loch Monar, Loch Mullardoch, Loch a' Bhealaich, Loch nan Eun, Loch na Leitreach, Loch an Laoigh, Loch Calavie, An Gead Loch, Loch an Tachdaidh, Loch Sgamhain, Loch a' Chroisg, Loch Clair, Loch Coulin, Loch Fhiarlaid, Loch Dughaill, Loch Coultrie, Loch Damph, Loch Lundie, Loch na A-Oidhche, Loch Maree, Loch a' Ghodhainn, Loch Ghaineamhach, Loch Bad an Sgalaig, Loch a' Bhraoin, Loch Fannich, Fionn Loch, Loch na Sealga, Loch Eye, Loch Glass, Loch Morie, Loch Ussie, Loch Achilty, Loch Garve, Loch Luichart, Loch Achanalt, Loch Meig, Loch Droma, Loch Glascarnoch, Loch Coire Làir, Loch Vaich, Loch a' Chaorunn, Loch na Caoidhe, Loch Beannacharain and the Orrin Reservoir.

Lewis is the northern part of Lewis and Harris, the largest island of the Outer Hebrides and the third largest in the British Isles after Britain and Ireland. Due to its flatter, more fertile land, Lewis contains three-quarters of the population of the Western Isles, and the largest settlement, Stornoway. To the west lie the isolated and uninhabited Flannan Isles.

Islands

Mainland

A' Ghlas-Leac
An Garbh-Eilean
Black Islands
Crowlin Islands
Eilean a' Chait
Eilean a' Mhal
Eilean an Inbhire Bhàin
Eilean an t-Sratha
Eilean Bàn
Eilean Chuaig
Eilean Dubh Dhurinis
Eilean Furadh Mòr
Eilean Horrisdale
Eilean Mòr
Eilean na Bà
Eilean na Bà Mòr
Eilean na Beinne
Eilean na Creige Duibhe
Eilean nam Feannag
Eilean nan Naomh
Eilean Stacan
Eilean Tioram
Eileanan Dubha
Fraoch Eilean
Fraoch Eilean Mòr
Glas Eilean
Gruinard Island
Isle of Ewe
Kishorn Island
Làrach Tigh Mhic Dhomhnuill
Longa Island
Sgeir a' Bhuic
Sgeir a' Ghair
Sgeir an Araig
Sgeir an Fheòir
Sgeir Bhuide
Sgeir Bhuidhe
Sgeir Chreagach
Sgeir Dùghaill
Sgeir Fhada
Sgeir Ghlas
Sgeir Maol Mhoraidh
Sgeir Maol Mhoraidh Shuas
Sgeir na Trian
Shieldaig Island
Strome Islands
Ulluva

Lewis

Àird Orasaigh
Bearasaigh
Bhuaile Mhòr
Bràighe Mòr
Bratanais Mòr
Campaigh
Ceabagh
Ceabhaigh
Cealasaigh
Cliatasaigh
Craigeam
Cruitear
Cùl Campaigh
Eilean a' Bhlàir
Eilean an Tighe
Eilean Àrnol
Eilean Beag a' Bhàigh
Eilean Bhàcasaigh
Eilean Bhinndealaim
Eilean Chearstaigh
Eilean Chalaibrigh
Eilean Chaluim Cille
Eilean Cheòis
Eilean Dubh a' Bhàigh
Eilean Fir Chrothair
Eilean Liubhaird
Eilean Mhealasta
Eilean Molach
Eilean Mòr a' Bhàigh
Eilean Mòr Lacasaidh
Eilean Mòr Phabail
Eilean nan Uan
Eilean Orasaidh
Eilean Orasaigh
Eilean Rosaidh
Eilean Sgarastaigh
Eilean Shìophoirt
Eilean Teinis
Eilean Thinngartsaigh
Eilean Thòraidh
Eilean Thuilm
Eilean Trosdam
Eughlam
Eunaigh Mòr
Flannan Isles
Fleisgeir
Flodaigh, Lewis
Flodaigh (Outer Loch Ròg)
Fuaigh Beag
Fuaigh Mòr
Garbh Eilean
Geile Sgeir
Glas Sgeir
Gousam
Great Bernera
Grèineam
Hairsgeir Beag
Hairsgeir Mòr
Lada Sgeir
Langaisgeir Mòr
Lewis (part of the larger Lewis and Harris island)
Linngeam
Liongam
Lìth Sgeir
Little Bernera
Màs Sgeir
Pabaigh Beag
Pabaigh Mòr
Riosaigh
Seanna Chnoc
Sgeir a' Mhurain
Sgeir Dhail
Sgeir Dhearg
Sgeir Ghlas Bheag
Sgeir Ghobhlach
Sgeir Leathann
Sgeir Liath
Sgeir Mhòr Shildinis
Sgeir Mol Srupair
Sgeir Sgianailt
Sgeir Tanais
Sgeirean An Arbhair
Shiant Islands
Siaram Bostadh
Siaram Mòr
Tabhaigh Bheag
Tabhaigh Mhòr
Tamna
Tanaraigh
Tannaraidh
Thalta Sgeir
Vacsay (Bhàcasaigh in Gaelic)

North Rona

Ghealldraig Mhòr
Gralisgeir
Lisgear Mhòr
North Rona
Sula Sgeir
Thamna Sgeir

Settlements

Mainland

Achnasheen
Alness
Applecross
Ardgay
Aultbea
Avoch
Ballintore
Barbaraville
Conon Bridge
Contin
Culrain
Diabaig
Dingwall
Dornie
Easter Fearn
Edderton
Evanton
Fearn
Garve
Gairloch
Hill of Fearn
Invergordon
Inverinate
Kilmuir, Black Isle
Kilmuir, Easter Ross
Kinlochewe
Kyle of Lochalsh
Laide
Marybank
Marburgh
Muir of Ord
Mulbuie
Munlochy
Nigg
North Kessock
Poolewe
Reraig
Shieldaig
Strathcarron
Strathpeffer
Stromeferry
Tain
Torridon

Isle of Lewis

Achmore
Adabrock
Aignish
Aird
Aird Uig
Airidhbhruaich
Arnol
Back
Balallan
Ballantrushal
Barvas
Borve
Bragar
Branahuie
Brue
Breaclete
Breanish
Breasclete
Calbost
Callanish
Carishader
Carloway
Caverstay
Cliff
Coll
Cromore
Cross
Crossbost
Crowlista
Dalbeg
Eagleton
Eorodale
Eoropie
Fivepenny
Flesherin
Garynahine
Garyvard
Geishader
Gisla
Gravir
Gress
Grimshader
Habost
Hacklete
Holm
Islivik
Keose
Keose Glebe
Kershader
Kirkibost
Kneep
Knockaird
Laxay
Laxdale
Lemreway
Leurbost
Lionel
Lower Bayble
Mangursta
Marvig
Marybank
Meavik
Melbost
Newmarket
Newvalley
North Dell
North Galson
North Tolsta
Orinsay
Parkend
Plasterfield
Portnaguran
Port of Ness
Portvoller
Ranish
Sandwick
Shader
Shawbost
Sheshader
Shieldenish
Shulishader
Skigersta
South Dell
South Galson
Steinish
Stornoway
Swainbost
Timsgarry
Tobson
Tong
Upper Bayble
Valtos

See also 
Mormaer of Ross
Bishop of Ross
James McKenzie

References

External links

Map of Ross-shire on Wikishire

Counties of Scotland
States and territories disestablished in 1890
 
Counties of the United Kingdom (1801–1922)